Armenia participated in the Eurovision Song Contest 2022 in Turin, Italy, with the song "Snap" performed by Rosa Linn. The internal selection of Rosa Linn as the Armenian artist in the 2022 contest was announced by the Armenian broadcaster Public Television of Armenia (AMPTV) on 11 March 2022, while the song "Snap" was later presented to the public on 19 March 2022.

Armenia was drawn to compete in the first semi-final of the Eurovision Song Contest which took place on 10 May 2022. Performing as the closing entry during the show in position 17, "Snap" was announced among the top 10 entries of the second semi-final and therefore qualified to compete in the final on 14 May. It was later revealed that Armenia placed fifth out of the 17 participating countries in the semi-final with 187 points. In the final, Armenia performed in position 8 and placed twentieth out of the 25 participating countries, scoring 61 points.

Background 

The nation briefly withdrew from the contest on two occasions: in  due to long-standing tensions with then-host country Azerbaijan, and in  due to social and political crises in the aftermath of the Second Nagorno-Karabakh War.

The Armenian national broadcaster, Public Television of Armenia (AMPTV), broadcasts the event within Armenia and organises the selection process for the nation's entry. Following their one-year absence, AMPTV confirmed their intentions to participate at the 2022 Eurovision Song Contest on 20 October 2021. Armenia has used various methods to select the Armenian entry in the past, such as internal selections and a live televised national final to choose the performer, song or both to compete at Eurovision. The broadcaster opted to internally select the 2022 Armenian entry.

Before Eurovision

Internal selection 
The Armenian entry for the Eurovision Song Contest 2022 was internally selected by the AMPTV together with local and international focus groups which included music professionals and Eurovision fans. Among acts rumoured by several Armenian media sites to be considered by the broadcaster were Athena Manoukian, Kamil Show, Rosa Linn and Saro Gevorgyan, the latter who submitted the song "Wicked Stranger" and was shortlisted along with Linn. Reports in February 2022 that Rosa Linn had been selected was denied by AMPTV, with the broadcaster's Head of Public Relations and Digital Communication Anna Ohanyan stating that no decision had been made yet and that the name of the artist would be announced in March 2022.

On 11 March 2022, Rosa Linn with the song "Snap", written and composed by Linn herself together with Larzz Principato, Jeremy Dusoulet, Allie Crystal, Tamar Kaprelian and Courtney Harrell, was announced as the Armenian entry. Tamar Kaprelian previously represented Armenia in the Eurovision Song Contest 2015 as part of the group Genealogy. Rosa Linn filmed the official video for the song prior to the presentation, which was directed by Aramayis Hayrapetyan. The song and video were presented to the public on 19 March 2022.

Promotion 
Rosa Linn made appearances across Europe to promote "Snap" as the Armenian Eurovision entry. On 7 April, Linn performed during the Israel Calling event held at the Menora Mivtachim Arena in Tel Aviv, Israel. On 9 April, Linn performed during the Eurovision in Concert event which was held at the AFAS Live venue in Amsterdam, Netherlands and hosted by Cornald Maas and Edsilia Rombley. In addition to her international appearances, Rosa Linn recorded her 'live-on-tape' performance in Sofia, Bulgaria on 19 March. This would have been used in the event that she was unable to travel to Turin, or subjected to quarantine on arrival.

In the run-up to the contest, AMPTV launched the promotional series Destination Eurovision that introduced and focused on Rosa Linn's journey to Turin, and covered the preparations for her Eurovision performance.

At Eurovision 

According to Eurovision rules, all nations with the exceptions of the host country and the "Big Five" (France, Germany, Italy, Spain and the United Kingdom) are required to qualify from one of two semi-finals in order to compete for the final; the top ten countries from each semi-final progress to the final. The European Broadcasting Union (EBU) split up the competing countries into six different pots based on voting patterns from previous contests, with countries with favourable voting histories put into the same pot. On 25 January 2022, an allocation draw was held which placed each country into one of the two semi-finals, as well as which half of the show they would perform in. Armenia was placed into the first semi-final, which was held on 10 May 2022, and was scheduled to perform in the second half of the show.

Once all the competing songs for the 2022 contest had been released, the running order for the semi-finals was decided by the shows' producers rather than through another draw, so that similar songs were not placed next to each other. Immediately after the close of the first semi-final, a press conference was held in which each of the artists drew the half of the final of which they would perform in.

The Armenian spokesperson, who announced the top 12-point score awarded by the Armenian jury during the final, was Garik Papoyan.

Semi-final 
Rosa Linn took part in technical rehearsals on 1 and 5 May, followed by dress rehearsals on 9 and 10 May. This included the jury show on 9 May where the professional juries of each country watched and voted on the competing entries.

The Armenian performance featured Rosa Linn alone on stage in a house-like structure made out of paper, representing the overflow of emotions Linn felt when writing the song. Over the course of the performance, Rosa Linn tore down several parts of the walls to reveal statements about the song. At the climax of the performance, the house rotated and Linn tore down an entire circle of the wall to face the audience in an intimate performance. The majority of the Armenian performance was warmly lit with golden LED lights on stage.

At the end of the show, Armenia was announced as having finished in the top 10 and subsequently qualifying for the grand final. This marked the first qualification to the final for Armenia since 2017. It was later revealed that the Armenia placed fifth in the semi-final, receiving a total of 187 points: 105 points from the televoting and 82 points from the juries.

Final
Shortly after the first semi-final, a winners' press conference was held for the ten qualifying countries. As part of this press conference, the qualifying artists took part in a draw to determine which half of the grand final they would subsequently participate in. This draw was done in the order the countries appeared in the semi-final running order. Armenia was drawn to compete in the first half. Following this draw, the shows' producers decided upon the running order of the final, as they had done for the semi-finals.

Rosa Linn once again took part in dress rehearsals on 13 and 14 May before the final, including the jury final where the professional juries cast their final votes before the live show. Linn performed a repeat of their semi-final performance during the final on 14 May. Armenia placed 20th in the final, scoring 61 points: 21 points from the televoting and 40 points from the juries. This marked Armenia's worst result in a Eurovision final since the country's debut in 2006.

Voting 

Below is a breakdown of points awarded to Armenia in the first semi-final and in the final. Voting during the three shows involved each country awarding two sets of points from 1-8, 10 and 12: one from their professional jury and the other from televoting. The exact composition of the professional jury, and the results of each country's jury and televoting were released after the final; the individual results from each jury member were also released in an anonymised form. The Armenian jury consisted of Vika Martirosyan, Arshaluys Harutyunyan, Erik Karapetyan, Lilit Navarsardyan, and Srbuk, the latter of whom represented Armenia in the Eurovision Song Contest 2019. This marked the first Armenian qualification to the final since 2017. In the final, Armenia placed 20th with 61 points.

Points awarded to Armenia

Points awarded by Armenia

Detailed voting results
The following members comprised the Armenian jury:
 Vika Martirosyan – choreographer, dancer
 Arshaluys Harutyunyan – film & theater director
 Erik Karapetyan – Singer-songwriter
 Lilit Navarsardyan – Composer, wrote the Armenian Eurovision entry in 2016
 Srbuk – singer, represented Armenia in the Eurovision Song Contest 2019

After Eurovision 
Following the contest, "Snap" went viral on video sharing service TikTok, featuring in almost 360,000 clips on the service by July 2022. The song reached the top of the charts in the Flanders region of Belgium, and the top ten in Germany, Austria, Netherlands, Ireland, Italy, Norway, Sweden and Switzerland.

References 

2022
Countries in the Eurovision Song Contest 2022
Eurovision